Kheer or Meoa is a sweet from the Bengal region of the Indian subcontinent. It is not only a sweet by itself, but it is also used as the main ingredient of many other sweets. In North India, Kheer (Payesam) is a type of rice pudding. But in Bengal, in the same spelling and sound, Kheer is a completely different dish. It is very similar to the Khoa but with its own distinct flavour and texture.

Preparation Process 
To prepare Kheer (evaporated milk), cow or buffalo milk is the key ingredient. Pure milk is boiled over an hour to make one-third of its original volume. This is Kheer. Sometimes to make a more sweet and different taste sugar, Arrowroot, Suji are mixed with it during boiling, but the taste of the unadulterated version is very different and tastes more authentic.

To make Khoa, the boiling process is extended to reduce the original volume to a fourth or fifth. Khoa is harder than Kheer. This hardness makes a difference to the taste, and is the difference Khoa (milk solids) and Kheer (evaporated milk).

Uses
As in Bengal, kheer is one of the most important ingredients for making sweets, it has a high demand in the market. In terms of hardness, it can be categorized in two forms:
 Khoa – hard kheer
 Kheer – semi-liquid kheer

Khoa is used to make some Bengali sweets like kansat. 

Kheer is used for Rosmalai like sweets, where small balls of chhena are immersed in kheer.

Some related sweets
 Kheerkadam (ক্ষীরকদম) A sweet from Meherpur district of Khulna division, Bangladesh.
 Kansat (An Indian sweet)
 Kheer er borfi' (ক্ষীরের বরফি) A barfi made out of kheer
 '''Pat kheer' (পাতক্ষীর) originated from [[ present day Munshiganj

Kheer in literature
Abanindranath Tagore wrote a story of two queens of a King, titled as Kheer er putul, means a doll made with kheer. In this story, one queen made her virtual son with Kheer and sent for marriage. Somehow Shathi Thakur' (a Goddess) ate it but captured as she stole this doll and in reply, she gave a son to that queen.

In idioms
There is a Bengali idioms circulated in Bengal i.e. 

Means if you keep your patience in your work then you must see the success'', as after devoting over an hour to boil milk to make delicious kheer. This idiom is customary to Bengali people and is used very often to advise someone.

References

Bengali cuisine
Indian cuisine
Indian dairy products